The Greater Connecticut Youth Orchestras (GCTYO) is based in Fairfield, Connecticut, US, and serves more than 350 students from over 30 surrounding towns, including Fairfield, Bridgeport, Trumbull, Monroe, Easton, Westport, Orange, Southbury, and numerous others. At the start of their new season in 2019, the organization changed its name to GCTYO (Greater Connecticut Youth Orchestras) from the original GBYO to broaden its reach beyond the Greater Bridgeport area and to reflect its current membership from all over Connecticut. The Orchestras perform at least three times a year in Bridgeport, Connecticut, at the Klein Memorial Auditorium. It was led for over 25 years by Robert Genualdi. The current Music Director and Principal Orchestra Conductor is Christopher Hisey, an alumnus of the program. He has been involved with the organization for over 30 years.

GCTYO consists of ten orchestras:
Principal Orchestra - Christopher Hisey, conductor
Bravura Orchestra - Gjorgj Kroqi, conductor
Symphony Orchestra - Lynda Smith, conductor
Concert Orchestra - Erica Messina, conductor
String Orchestra - Bruce Sloat, conductor
Wind Orchestra - Brian Miller, conductor
Percussion Orchestra - Jim Royle Drum Studio (Brian Ente, conductor)
Jazz Orchestra I - Dr. Rex Cadwallader, Director
Jazz Orchestra II - Geoffrey Brookes, conductor
Chamber Orchestra - Christopher Hisey, conductor

Performances
2013
In 2013, the Principal Orchestra of the Greater Bridgeport Youth Orchestras played a Christmas-themed benefit concert at Carnegie Hall with Jackie Evancho and James Galway, that was produced by Tim Janis.

2014 
In 2014, GCTYO traveled to China to play 4 concerts in Xian, Shanghai, Beijing, and Hangzhou over a period of 12 days. 

2015

In 2015, GCTYO had its first annual Lawn Concert on the Great Lawn of the Pequot Library in Southport, Connecticut.

2016
In 2016, GCTYO traveled to Italy and performed in Rome and Florence. 

2018
In 2018, GCTYO toured Scotland and Iceland and performed at the iconic Harpa Hall in Reykjavik.

2019 
In 2019, the Greater Bridgeport Youth Orchestras became Greater Connecticut Youth Orchestras to better reflect its members who come from all over Connecticut to rehearse each week.

References

External links
GCTYO homepage

American youth orchestras
Musical groups established in 1961
Organizations based in Bridgeport, Connecticut
Tourist attractions in Bridgeport, Connecticut
Musical groups from Bridgeport, Connecticut
1961 establishments in Connecticut
Youth organizations based in Connecticut
Performing arts in Connecticut